Metro East is a region in southern Illinois that contains eastern and northern suburbs and exurbs of St. Louis, Missouri, United States. It encompasses five Southern Illinois counties (and parts of three others) in the St. Louis Metropolitan Statistical Area. The region's most populated city is Belleville, with 45,000 residents. The Metro East is the second largest urban area in Illinois after the Chicago metropolitan area and, as of the 2000 census, the population of the Metro East statistical area was 599,845 residents, a figure that had risen to above 700,000 in 2010. The significant growth in the Metro East is mainly due to people in smaller outlying towns in Illinois moving to the area for better economic/job opportunities.

Geography
The Metro East is a loose collection of small and mid-sized cities sitting along the American Bottom and the bluffs of the Mississippi River. According to the U.S. Census Bureau, the five counties of the region have a total area of 6,974 km2 (2,692 mi2). 6,787 km2 (2,620 mi2) of it is land and 186 km2 (71 mi2) of it (2.74%) is water.

As of the 2020 census, the most populated cities in the region included the following

Demographics
As of the 2010 census, there had been a major shift in population from the older rust belt industrial cities in the Mississippi River bottom, such as East St. Louis and Alton, to the more suburban satellite cities, such as, Belleville, Edwardsville, and O'Fallon sitting on the bluffs. This is mainly due to continued white flight.

As of the census of 2000, there were 599,845 people, 229,888 households, and 160,260 families residing in the five Metro East counties.

The most common language is English, although various other languages are spoken. German speakers exist in southeastern Madison, and Clinton, and southern and eastern St. Clair Counties.  Spanish is spoken in the Fairmont City area, and in parts of Clinton County. The largest concentration of African-Americans is in Madison, Venice, western Granite City, East St. Louis, Washington Park, Belleville, Cahokia, Alorton and Alton. Secondary languages tend to be cultural or reminiscent of ancestry, and not related to the general business of the area.

List of counties 
Bond
Calhoun
Clinton
Jersey
Madison
Monroe
St. Clair

List of cities, towns, and villages
Notes: 
^ means part of city in another county/counties
Bold indicates county seat

Clinton County

Jersey County

Madison County

St. Clair County

Colleges and universities
Kaskaskia College
Lewis and Clark Community College
Lindenwood University-Belleville
McKendree University
The Principia
Southern Illinois University Edwardsville
Southwestern Illinois College

Transportation

State routes

U.S. routes 
U.S. Route 40
U.S. Route 50
U.S. Route 51
Historic U.S. Route 66
U.S. Route 67

Interstate freeways 
I-55
I-64
I-70
I-255
I-270

Light rail 
The Metro East is connected with Missouri by the Metro Link light rail train. The Metrolink includes 11 stations on the Illinois side of St Louis, from the East St. Louis Riverfront, through Belleville Illinois, and ending at Scott Air Force Base. It links the Metro East to downtown St. Louis, area universities, downtown Clayton, and the major commercial airport, Lambert St. Louis International.

St. Clair County (East St. Louis, Washington Park, Fairview Heights, Swansea, O'Fallon, Cahokia, Belleville, Shiloh, and Scott AFB) shares public transit with the St. Louis metropolitan area, including bus and rail. Madison County has a public transit system that includes bus services and bikeways converted as part of a Rail to Trail conversion.

Major employers
Anheuser-Busch
Boeing
Charter Communications
Illinois Department of Transportation
Korte Construction
Monsanto
National Steel
Norrenberns Trucking
Olin Corporation
Scott Air Force Base
Southern Illinois University Edwardsville
U.S. Steel
Wood River Refinery

Tourist attractions

 National Shrine of Our Lady of the Snows, Centreville, near Belleville; operated by the Missionary Oblates of Mary Immaculate
 Brooks Catsup Bottle, Collinsville
 Belle Clair Fairgrounds and Expo Center, Belleville
 Cahokia Mounds, Collinsville, on Madison-St. Clair County line
 Confluence Crush Roller Derby, Belleville (at Belle Clair Fairgrounds)
 GCS Ballpark, Sauget
 Gateway International Raceway, Madison
 Eads Bridge, historic bridge, among East. Louis, on the East St. Louis, Illinois, and St. Louis, Missouri border, over the Mississippi River
 Pere Marquette State Park, Grafton
 Raging Rivers Water Park, Grafton
 The Game, Glen Carbon
 St. Clair Square, Fairview Heights
 Robert Wadlow Statue, Alton
 Horseshoe Lake, Pontoon Beach, Madison, and Granite City
 Alton Square Mall, Alton
 Carlyle Lake, Carlyle
 National Building Arts Center, Sauget

Residents, historic figures, and contributors

Josephine Baker, East St. Louis, performer and activist
Jason Boyd, Edwardsville, AAA pitcher
Ray Bradbury, Belleville, science fiction author
Jimmy Connors, East St. Louis and Belleville, tennis player
Neal Cotts, Lebanon, former MLB pitcher
Brian Daubach, Belleville, former MLB 1B/DH/outfielder
Miles Davis, East St. Louis and Alton, jazz artist
Lea DeLaria, Belleville, jazz singer, actress, and comedian (Orange is the New Black)
Elizabeth Donald, Edwardsville, horror novelist
Dick Durbin, East St. Louis, U.S. senator
Buddy Ebsen, Belleville, television actor
Jay Farrar, Belleville, musician
William Holden, O'Fallon, film actor
Louis Jolliet, explorer of the Mississippi River
Jackie Joyner-Kersee, East St. Louis, Olympic athlete
Ken Kwapis, Belleville, film and television director and producer
Père Jacques Marquette, French discoverer
T. J. Mathews, Columbia, former MLB pitcher
Laurie Metcalf, Edwardsville, film and television actress (Rosanne, Uncle Buck, JFK)
Yadier Molina, Caseyville, Cardinals Baseball catcher (resides there only during baseball season, and is originally from Puerto Rico)
Jake Odorizzi, Highland, MLB Pitcher
Van Allen Plexico, Smithton, author and professor
Peter Sarsgaard, Belleville/Scott AFB, actor (Magnificent Seven, Jarhead, Green Lantern)
John Shimkus, Collinsville, Congressman from Illinois's 15th congressional district (1997–2021)
Michael Stipe, Collinsville, lead singer of the band REM
Jeff Tweedy, Belleville, lead singer of the band Wilco
Uncle Tupelo, Belleville, alternative country band
Craig Virgin, distance runner
Robert Pershing Wadlow, Alton, world's tallest man
Scott Wolf, Belleville, actor

Media in the Metro East

St. Louis area TV stations 
Note: This list is for the entire Metro East area; however, the low-powered stations may not reach the entire five-county Metro East area. WSIU, despite not being based from the St. Louis DMA, is available in Clinton, Washington, and most of St. Clair.

Champaign-Urbana/Decatur/Springfield area TV stations 
Note: This list is for Jersey County; however, the majority of these stations are not available for most Jersey County residents. These stations are more likely to be available in Greene and Macoupin counties, which border Jersey County.

Paducah/Cape Girardeau/Harrisburg area TV stations 
Note: This list is for St. Clair, and Clinton counties; however, the majority of the stations, with the exception of WSIU and WPXS and possibly KFVS, are not available for a majority of the St. Clair, and/or Clinton County residents. These stations are more likely to be available in Washington County and the Centralia area.

Daily newspapers 
Note:  daily newspaper coverage depends on county.
Alton Telegraph  (Madison, Jersey counties)
Belleville News-Democrat (region-wide)
Centralia Sentinel (Clinton and Washington counties)
Southern Illinoisan (mainly in Washington County, rarely found elsewhere in the Metro East)
St. Louis Post-Dispatch (region-wide)
Edwardsville Intelligencer  (Madison County)

Radio stations 
Note:  stations listed are licensed and have offices in Metro East counties only.  Stations that can be heard in the Metro East but not listed have offices outside the Metro East counties.

See also: Radio stations in Illinois

The Metro East in film 
Note, the following is a partial list of films shot, often partially, sometimes with significant production, within the Metro East.  All data can be rechecked via the Internet Movie Database. 
"Uncredited" means a Metro East location was not credited within the database, but was clearly shot on Metro East soil upon watching the film itself.

In the Heat of the Night - feature-length film, shot in Belleville, Illinois (1968 Oscar winner for Best Picture of 1967)
Things Are Tough All Over (uncredited) - feature-length film, shot on the East St. Louis riverfront (1982)
King of the Hill - feature-length film, shot in Alton, Illinois (1993)
A Will of their Own - feature-length TV film, shot in Belleville, Illinois (1998)
The Big Brass Ring - feature-length film, shot in Alton, Illinois (1999)
Steel City - feature-length film, shot in Alton, East Alton, Godfrey, and Jerseyville, Illinois (2006)
The Lucky Ones - feature-length film, Shot in Edwardsville, Illinois (2008)
The Coverup - feature-length film, shot in Alton, Illinois (2008)
Kingshighway - feature-length film, shot in Fairview Heights, Illinois (2010)
Joint Body - feature-length film, shot in various locations throughout the Metro East (2011)

Metro East in fiction
Laurell K. Hamilton has used the Metro East as a setting in several books from the Anita Blake and Merry Gentry series. In the Merry Gentry series, fairies of the Unseelie Court have made their home in Monk's Mound.

Robert J. Randisi set one of his Joe Keough mysteries, East of the Arch (2002), in the Metro East communities of East St. Louis and Fairview Heights.

Awards
The 2010 issue of Family Circle magazine named Edwardsville third in their "Top 10 Best Towns for Families".

Area codes 
Area code 217:  extreme northeast part of Metro East
Area code 618:  the majority of the Metro East is in this area code.

References

External links
Illinois Department of Employment Security - Metro East: 1965 to Today By: Dennis Hoffman

 
Regions of Illinois
Regions of Greater St. Louis